Local elections were held in Quezon City on May 10, 2010, within the Philippine general election. The voters elected for the elective local posts in the city: the mayor, vice mayor, four District representatives, and councilors, six in each of the city's four legislative districts.

Mayoral and vice mayoral election
Incumbents mayor Feliciano Belmonte, Jr. and vice mayor Herbert Bautista is now on their third term as mayor and vice mayor of Quezon City. Bautista announced that he is running for the mayorship of the city. They are running under the Liberal Party although Belmonte is the SVP for External Affairs of Lakas-Kampi-CMD. Belmonte's daughter Joy is Bautista's running mate. If Belmonte wins, she will be the third female vice mayor next to Charito Planas and Connie Angeles. Mayor Belmonte is running for a congressional post in the 4th District where he served there as representative from 1992 to 2001. Bautista ran for mayor in 1998, but lost to Ismael Mathay, Jr.

Former three-term mayor Ismael Mathay, Jr. is also running for mayor as an independent candidate. He served as mayor from 1992 to 2001. Before he became mayor, he was the former Quezon City 4th District Representative from 1988 to 1992. He ran for mayor in 2004 but lost to Sonny Belmonte.

Former Presidential Chief of Staff Mike Defensor is running under the Nacionalista Party. Defensor was the former Quezon City 3rd District Representative, then he became the chairman of the Housing and Urban Development Coordinate Council, Secretary of the Department of Environment and Natural Resources and Presidential Chief of Staff. He ran for senator under TEAM Unity, but he ranked 15 in the polls. His running mate is actress and three term 2nd District Councilor Aiko Melendez of the Pwersa ng Masang Pilipino. They are part of the Performance Team, which consists of members (Mayor, Vice Mayor, Congressman & Councilors) from Lakas-Kampi-CMD, NP & PMP. Defensor & Melendez are part of the team.

Quezon City 2nd District Representative Mary Ann Susano is on her second term as representative. She is eligible to run for a third term. But, she insisted to run for mayor under the Nationalist People's Coalition. If she wins, she will be the second female mayor next to Adelina S. Rodriguez. Her running mate is 4th District councilor Janet Malaya. This was the first time that two females are teaming up for the highest positions in the City.

Other candidates for the mayorship are 4th District councilor Ariel Inton, Jay Bautista, John Charles Chang, Engracio Icasiano, Henry Samonte and Roberto Sombillo.

Candidates

Team SB

Results
The candidates for mayor and vice mayor with the highest number of votes wins the seat; they are voted separately, therefore, they may be of different parties when elected.

Mayoral election results

Vice Mayoral election results

Congressional election results

1st District
Vincent "Bingbong" Crisologo is the incumbent representative of the first district of Quezon City. Crisologo, filed a case in the Metropolitan Trial Court (MeTC) of Quezon City for the exclusion of candidate Vivienne Tan from the voter's list of the district, on the grounds that (1) she was not a Filipino citizen when she registered as a voter, and (2) she failed to meet the residency requirements under the law. Tan, the daughter of business magnate Lucio Tan, migrated to the United States and became a naturalized American citizen on January 19, 1993. She returned to the Philippines in 1996 and has resided here since. The MeTC ruled in favor of Crisologo. Tan appealed and won in the Regional Trial Court (RTC), but Crisologo appealed to the Court of Appeals, which disqualified Tan as "Not being a Filipino citizen at the time of her application to be registered as a voter on October 26, 2009 or at the time when her said application was approved by the [Commission on Elections] on November 16, 2009, Tan's inclusion in the voter’s list of Precinct 0853-A, Sto. Domingo, Quezon City, is therefore, highly irregular and downright invalid." The CA ruled in favor of Congressman Bingbong Crisologo. Further, Immigration Commissioner Marcelino Libanan certified that Tan re-acquired her Filipino citizenship only on December 1. On November 8, 2017, the Supreme Court of the Philippines affirmed the ruling of the Court of Appeals. The Supreme Court ruled that Tan was not a Filipino Citizenship at the time when she registered as a voter and thus her inclusion in the voter's list was highly irregular. Tan registered as a voter on 26 October 2009, before taking her Oath of Allegiance to the Republic of the Philippines on 30 November 2009. Under Philippine law, to be able to run for Congress, a candidate is required, among others, to be a natural born citizen of the Philippines, a registered voter in the district in which he or she shall be elected, and a resident thereof for a period of not less than one year immediately preceding the day of the election. The Supreme Court stated that she could not have been a registered voter since when she registered as a voter, she was not a Filipino Citizen. Thus it follows, that Tan could not be a candidate for Congress since she was not a registered voter in the district where she was hoping to be elected.

2nd District
Incumbent Mary Ann Susano is running for mayor of Quezon City.

3rd District
Matias Defensor, Jr. is the incumbent.

4th District
Incumbent Nanette Castelo-Daza is already in her third consecutive term and is ineligible for reelection.

City council elections
Each of Quezon City's four legislative districts elects six councilors to the City Council. The six candidates with the highest number of votes wins those district's six seats in the council. Some who are running are celebrities.

Summary

District 1

|-bgcolor=black
|colspan=5|

District 2

|-bgcolor=black
|colspan=5|

District 3

|-bgcolor=black
|colspan=5|

District 4

|-bgcolor=black
|colspan=5|

References

External links
 The Official Website of Herbert Bautista
 The Official Website of Ismael "Mel" Mathay, Jr.
 The Official Website of Annie Rosa Susano
 Philstar

2010 Philippine local elections
Elections in Quezon City
Politics of Quezon City
2010 elections in Metro Manila